The 2012 UEFA European Under-19 Championship was the 61st edition of UEFA's European Under-19 Championship (the eleventh since the age competition change to an Under-19 level) and took place in Estonia from 3 to 15 July. Spain were the defending champions. This competition also acted as a qualifying competition for the 2013 FIFA U-20 World Cup, as six sides from Europe qualify.

Players born after 1 January 1993 were eligible to participate in this competition.

Qualification

Qualification for the final tournament occurred in two stages: a qualifying round and an elite round. During these rounds, 51 national teams competed to determine the seven teams that would join the automatically qualified host nation Estonia.

The qualifying round was played between 21 September and 16 November 2011. Liechtenstein did not enter and England, France and Spain received a bye to the elite round as a result of their UEFA ranking coefficient. The remaining 48 teams were divided into 12 groups of four teams, with each group being contested as a mini-tournament hosted by one of the group's teams. After all matches were played, the 12 group winners, 12 group runners-up and the best third-placed team advanced to the elite round.

The elite round was played between 23 and 31 May 2012. The 28 teams entering this phase were split into seven groups of four teams for a further round of mini-tournaments. The seven group winners qualified for the final tournament.

Qualified teams
The following eight teams qualified for the final tournament:

1 Bold indicates champion for that year. Italic indicates host for that year.
2 As Serbia and Montenegro

Venues

Match officials
UEFA named six referees and eight assistant referees for the tournament on 18 June 2012, all who are young and upcoming top referees in Europe. Additionally two Estonian referees were chosen as fourth officials for the group stage matches.

Squads

Results

Group stage
The draw was held on 6 June 2012 in Tallinn, Estonia.

Each group winner and runner-up advanced to the semifinals. The top three teams in each group also qualified for the 2013 FIFA U-20 World Cup.

If two or more teams are equal on points on completion of the group matches, the following criteria are applied to determine the rankings.
 Higher number of points obtained in the group matches played among the teams in question
 Superior goal difference from the group matches played among the teams in question
 Higher number of goals scored in the group matches played among the teams in question
 If, after applying criteria 1) to 3) to several teams, two teams still have an equal ranking, the criteria 1) to 3) will be reapplied to determine the ranking of these teams. If this procedure does not lead to a decision, criteria 5) and 7) will apply
 Results of all group matches:
 Superior goal difference
 Higher number of goals scored
 Respect Fair Play ranking of the teams in question
 Drawing of lots
Additionally, if two teams which have the same number of points and the same number of goals scored and conceded play their last group match against each other and are still equal at the end of that match, their final rankings are determined by the penalty shoot-out and not by the criteria listed above. This procedure is applicable only if a ranking of the teams is required to determine the group winner and the runner-up.

All times are Eastern European Summer Time (UTC+3)

Group A

Group B

Knockout stage

Bracket

Semi-finals

Final

Goalscorers
5 goals
 Jesé

3 goals
 Dimitris Diamantakos
 Giorgos Katidis

2 goals

 Benik Afobe
 Domagoj Pavičić
 Mihael Pongračić
 Paul Pogba
 Samuel Umtiti
 Betinho
 André Gomes
 Paco Alcácer
 Gerard Deulofeu

1 goal

 Karl-Eerik Luigend
 Nathaniel Chalobah
 Harry Kane
 John Lundstram
 Nathan Redmond
 Dimitri Foulquier
 Richard-Quentin Samnick
 Jordan Veretout
 Thibaut Vion
 Mavroudis Bougaidis
 Spyros Fourlanos
 Giannis Gianniotas
 Charalambos Lykogiannis
 Bruma
 João Mário
 Daniel Martins
 Nikola Ninković
 Derik
 Denis Suárez

1 own goal
 Artur Pikk (against Portugal)

Team of the tournament
After the final, the UEFA technical team selected 23 players to integrate the "team of the tournament".

Goalkeepers
  Simon Sluga
  Alphonse Areola
  Sokratis Dioudis

Defenders
  Nathaniel Chalobah
  Samuel Umtiti
  Dimitri Foulquier
  Mavroudis Bougaidis
  Kostas Stafylidis
  Álex Grimaldo
  Derik Osede

Midfielders
  Domagoj Pavičić
  Paul Pogba
  Giorgos Katidis
  André Gomes
  José Campaña
  Saúl Ñíguez
  Suso
  Óliver Torres

Forwards
  Benik Afobe
  Dimitris Diamantakos
  Giannis Gianniotas
  Paco Alcácer
  Gerard Deulofeu
  Jesé

References

External links

 Official website
 Official event website

 
2012
UEFA European Under-19 Championship
UEFA European Under-19 Championship
2012 UEFA European Under-19 Championship
July 2012 sports events in Europe
2012 in youth association football